Zheng Saisai was the defending champion, but chose not to participate.

Peng Shuai won the title, defeating Zhu Lin in the final, 6–2, 3–6, 6–2.

Seeds

Draw

Finals

Top half

Bottom half

References

Main Draw

Suzhou Ladies Open - Singles